Premna serratifolia is a small tree/shrub in the family Lamiaceae. It flowers and fruits between May and November. During flowering season, it attracts a large number of butterflies and bees. Synonyms of  Premna serratifolia Linn. include P. corymbosa (Burm. f.) Merr., P. integrifolia L. and  P. obtusifolia R. Br.).

Habitat
It mostly grow in moist sandy soil and scrub jungles along seacoasts and mangrove forests. In the Philippines, particularly in Cebu Island, it is usually found in the interior, watery forests of Southern Cebu.

Description
Trees, to 7 m high. Leaves simple, opposite, estipulate; petiole 4–14 mm, slender, pubescent, grooved above; lamina 2.5-8.5 x 2–7.2 cm, elliptic, elliptic-oblong, base acute, obtuse, subcordate or rounded, apex acuminate, mucronate, obtuse, margin entire or subserrate, glabrous above except along the appressed midrib, chartaceous; lateral nerves 3-5 pair, pinnate, prominent, puberulous beneath; intercostae reticulate, obscure. Flowers bisexual, greenish-white, in terminal corymbose panicled cymes; bracts small; calyx small campanulate, 2 lipped, 5 lobed; corolla tube short, villous inside, lobes 5; stamens 4, didynamous, inserted below the throat of the corolla tube; anther ovate; ovary superior, 2-4-celled, ovules 4; style linear; stigma shortly bifid. Fruit a drupe, seated on the calyx, globose, purple; seeds oblong.

Medicinal uses

The plant is extensively used in Indian traditional medicine. Studies on the root wood of P. serattifolia led to the isolation of acteoside, a glucoside derivative.  The root bark of the plant which showed biological activities have also shown to contain a potent cytotoxic and antioxidant diterpene, 11,12,16-trihydroxy-2-oxo-5-methyl-10-demethyl-abieta-1[10],6, 8,11,13-pentene.

Culinary uses

In Vietnam, the aromatic leaves of P. serratifolia are called , and are used to cook in some braise or stir fry dishes with chicken, eels or frogs.

References

Further reading
 Flora of Tamil Nadu, VOL. II, 1987
 Premna serratifolia L., Mant. Pl. 2: 253. 1771; Gamble, Fl. Pres. Madras 1096(767). 1924; Ramach. & V.J. Nair, Fl. Cannanore Dist. 357. 1988; Antony, Syst. Stud. Fl. Kottayam Dist. 318. 1989; Rajendran & Daniel, Indian Verbenaceae 284. 2002.
 Premna integrifolia L., Mant. Pl. 2: 252. 1771, nom. illeg.; Hook. f., Fl. Brit. India 4: 574. 1885.
 Premna obtusifolia R. Br., Prodr. 512. 1810; Manilal & Sivar., Fl. Calicut 230. 1982; Ansari, Fl. Kasaragod Div. 296. 1985

serratifolia
Flora of East Tropical Africa
Flora of the Western Indian Ocean
Flora of temperate Asia
Flora of tropical Asia
Flora of Australia
Flora of the Pacific
Taxa named by Carl Linnaeus